The 2006 Ireland rugby union tour of New Zealand and Australia was a series of matches played in June 2006 in New Zealand and Australia by Ireland national rugby union team.

Touring party
Ireland sent a squad of 31 players on the tour.

 Manager: Eddie O'Sullivan
 Captain: Brian O'Driscoll

Backs

Forwards

First Test with All Blacks 

New Zealand: 15.Mils Muliaina, 14.Doug Howlett, 13.Ma'a Nonu, 12.Aaron Mauger, 11.Joe Rokocoko, 10.Luke McAlister, 9.Byron Kelleher, 8.Rodney So'oialo, 7.Richie McCaw (capt.), 6.Marty Holah, 5.Greg Rawlinson, 4.Chris Jack, 3.Carl Hayman, 2.Keven Mealamu, 1.Clarke Dermody,  – replacements: 17.Neemia Tialata, 18.Troy Flavell, 19.Jerome Kaino, 20.Jimmy Cowan      –  No entry : 16.Anton Oliver, 21.David Hill, 22.Scott Hamilton
Ireland: 15.Geordan Murphy, 14.Shane Horgan, 13.Brian O'Driscoll (capt.), 12.Gordon D'Arcy, 11.Andrew Trimble, 10.Ronan O'Gara, 9.Peter Stringer, 8.Denis Leamy, 7.David Wallace, 6.Neil Best, 5.Paul O'Connell, 4.Donncha O'Callaghan, 3.John Hayes, 2.Jerry Flannery, 1.Marcus Horan,  – replacements: 16.Rory Best, 17.Bryan Young, 18.Mick O'Driscoll, 19.Keith Gleeson, 20.Isaac Boss, 21.Denis Hickie, 22.Girvan Dempsey

Second Test with All Blacks 

New Zealand: 15.Mils Muliaina, 14.Doug Howlett, 13.Casey Laulala, 12.Aaron Mauger, 11.Joe Rokocoko, 10.Luke McAlister, 9.Byron Kelleher, 8.Rodney So'oialo, 7.Richie McCaw (capt.), 6.Jerome Kaino, 5.Troy Flavell, 4.Chris Jack, 3.Carl Hayman, 2.Keven Mealamu, 1.Clarke Dermody,  – replacements: 16.Andrew Hore, 17.Neemia Tialata, 18.Greg Rawlinson, 19.Craig Newby, 20.Jimmy Cowan, 21.David Hill, 22.Ma'a Nonu 
Ireland: 15.Geordan Murphy, 14.Shane Horgan, 13.Brian O'Driscoll (capt.), 12.Gordon D'Arcy, 11.Andrew Trimble, 10.Ronan O'Gara, 9.Peter Stringer, 8.Denis Leamy, 7.David Wallace, 6.Neil Best, 5.Paul O'Connell, 4.Donncha O'Callaghan, 3.John Hayes, 2.Jerry Flannery, 1.Marcus Horan,  – replacements: 16.Rory Best, 17.Bryan Young, 18.Mick O'Driscoll, 19.Keith Gleeson, 20.Isaac Boss, 21.Denis Hickie, 22.Girvan Dempsey

Test against Wallabies 

Australia: 15.Chris Latham, 14.Mark Gerrard, 13.Stirling Mortlock, 12.Mat Rogers, 11.Lote Tuqiri, 10.Stephen Larkham, 9.George Gregan (capt), 8.Rocky Elsom, 7.George Smith, 6.Mark Chisholm, 5.Dan Vickerman, 4.Nathan Sharpe, 3.Guy Shepherdson, 2.Tai McIsaac, 1.Greg Holmes,  – replacements: 16.Jeremy Paul, 17.Al Baxter, 18.Wycliff Palu, 19.Phil Waugh, 20.Sam Cordingley, 21.Clyde Rathbone, 22.Cameron Shepherd 
Ireland: 15.Girvan Dempsey, 14.Shane Horgan, 13.Brian O'Driscoll (capt.), 12.Gordon D'Arcy, 11.Andrew Trimble, 10.Ronan O'Gara, 9.Peter Stringer, 8.Denis Leamy, 7.David Wallace, 6.Neil Best, 5.Paul O'Connell, 4.Donncha O'Callaghan, 3.John Hayes, 2.Jerry Flannery, 1.Marcus Horan,  – replacements: 16.Rory Best, 17.Bryan Young, 18.Mick O'Driscoll, 19.Keith Gleeson, 20.Isaac Boss, 21.Jeremy Staunton, 22.Geordan Murphy

See also
 History of rugby union matches between All Blacks and Ireland
 History of rugby union matches between Australia and Ireland

References

2006
2006
2006 rugby union tours
2006 in Australian rugby union
2006 in New Zealand rugby union
tour